Frané Lessac is a U.S.-born author, illustrator and painter who lives in Western Australia. She has published many children's books and won numerous awards for her illustrations.

Early life 
Lessac grew up in Cliffside Park, New Jersey, a small town outside New York City. As a child, she spent many weekends in museums and galleries. At the age of 18 she moved to Malibu, California, to study ethnographic film at the University of Southern California and UCLA. She worked at many jobs to finance her studies, including projectionist at the local cinema.

Lessac moved to the Caribbean island of Montserrat in 1979, where she began her career as a painter. Inspired by the beauty of the island, she concentrated on painting the old West Indies architecture and its people.

In 1983 Lessac left Montserrat and moved to London, where she began to exhibit regularly and published her first book, My Little Island (1984), which was a compilation of her paintings of Montserrat and her "love letter" to the island.

Career 
After My Little Island, Lessac went on to publish a number of children's books, initially in the U.K, the U.S and later in the state of Western Australia, where she relocated with her husband, author and musician Mark Greenwood.

In 1989 she created the illustration for the cover of the fund-raising album After The Hurricane – Songs For Montserrat. 

In 2002 Lessac founded a Western Australian Branch of the Society of Children's Book Writers and Illustrators, and she has served on the executive committee of the Australian Society of Authors.

Recognition

For her contribution to children's literature in Western Australia, Lessac was awarded the 2010 Muriel Barwell Award by the Children's Book Council of Australia WA Branch.

Her first book, My Little Island, was named Children's Book of the Year by the St Martins Children's Book Council and also became a feature book on the popular U.S television program Reading Rainbow.

In 2002 Lessac won the Western Australian Premier's Book Awards for The Legend of Moondyne Joe was nominated as an Honor book in the Children's Book of the Year Award: Eve Pownall Award for Information Books for Simpson and his Donkey both of which were written by her husband and frequent collaborator, Mark Greenwood.

Personal life and family
Lessac is married to Mark Greenwood, also an author of children's books, and they are parents to film producer Cody Greenwood.

Cody's most recent film, Under the Volcano, a documentary about the AIR Montserrat recording studios, arose from memories of the family's frequent visits to Montserrat as she was growing up in the 1990s and 2000s. Lessac visited Montserrat in August 2019, while Cody was filming, and burst into tears upon leaving.

Selected works

As illustrator
  The Dragon of Redonda by Jan Jackson (1986)
  The Chalk Doll by Charlotte Pomerantz (1989)
  The Bird Who Was An Elephant by Aleph Kamal (1989)
  The Turtle and The Island by Barbra Ker Wilson (1990)
  Nine O'Clock Lullaby by Marilyn Singer (1990)
  Caribbean Carnivalsongs by Irving Burgie (1992)
  The Fire Children retold by Eric Maddern (1993)
  Little Gray Oneby Jan Wahl (1993)
  Not A Copper Penny by Monica Gunning (1993)
  Magic Boomerang by Mark Greenwood (1994)
  Wonderful Towers of Wattsby Patricia Zelver (1994)
  Outback Adventure by Mark Greenwood (1994)
  The Distant Talking Drum by Isaac Olaleye (1994)
  Good Rhymes Good Times by Lee Bennett Hopkins (1995) 
  Our Big Island by Mark Greenwood (1995)
  O Christmas Tree! by Vashanti Rahaman (1996)
  Queen Esther Saves Her People Rita Gelman (1998)	
  On the Same Day in March by Marilyn Singer (2000)
  The Legend of Moondyne Joe Mark Greenwood & Frané Lessac (2002)
  Capital! Washington D-C from A-Z by Laura Melmed (2003)
  Maui and the Big Fish by Barbra Ker Wilson (2003)
  New York- The Big Apple from A-Z by Laura Melmed (2005)
  Monday on the Mississippi by Marilyn Singer (2005) 
  The Day of the Elephant by Barbra Ker Wilson (2005)
  Simpson and his Donkey  Mark Greenwood & Frané Lessac (2008)    
  Clouds by Anne Rockwell (2008) 
  Heart of Texas by Laura Melmed (2009)
  Ned Kelly and the Green Sash Mark Greenwood & Frané Lessac (2010)    
  The Greatest Liar on Earth Mark Greenwood & Frané Lessac (2012)    
  The Drummer Boy of John John Mark Greenwood & Frané Lessac (2012)
The Book Boat's In  Cynthia Cotten & Frané Lessac (2013)
Midnight  Mark Greenwood & Frané Lessac (2014)
  The  Mayflower  Mark Greenwood & Frané Lessac (2014)
  A is for Australia   (2015)
  Pattan's Pumpkin  Chitra Soundar & Frané Lessac (2016)
We Are Grateful: Otsaliheliga Traci Sorell & Frané Lessac (2018)
 We Are Still Here Traci Sorell & Frané Lessac (2021)
Ancient Wonders  Mark Greenwood & Frané Lessac (2022)

As author and illustrator
  My Little Island (1984)
  Caribbean Canvas (1987)	
  Caribbean Alphabet (1989)
  Camp Granada  (2003)
  Island Counting 1-2-3 (2005)
  A is for Australia  (2015)
  A is for Australian Animals (2017)
Under the Southern Cross (2018)
Australian Baby Animals (2019)
Under the Milky Way  (2019)
Australia Under the Sea 1, 2, 3  (2020)
 A is for Australian Reefs  (2022)

References

1954 births
American emigrants to Australia
American children's writers
Australian children's writers
Living people
Writers from New Jersey